Marcel Maximi Joseph (born 30 March 1997) is a Bahamian footballer who plays for SCU Heat in the UPSL, and the Bahamas national football team.

Club career
For the 2019 USL League Two season, Joseph signed for Florida Elite Soccer Academy. Over the course of the season, he made eight appearances, scoring two goals. Following the COVID-19 pandemic which saw the 2020 USL League Two season cancelled Joseph signed for Side 92 FC of the United Premier Soccer League, joining fellow-Bahamians Valin Bodie and coach Corie Frazer. Joseph had scored five goals eight games into the season. For the 2021 Fall UPSL season, Joseph joined SCU Heat, based in Columbia, South Carolina.

International career
Joseph made his senior international debut for the Bahamas on 18 November 2018, playing all ninety minutes in a 1–1 home draw with Anguilla.

International goals
Scores and results list the Bahamas' goal tally first.

International statistics

References

External links

Profile at Southern Wesleyan Athletics
Profile at Southern Nazarene Athletics
USL League Two profile

1997 births
Living people
Bahamian footballers
Bahamas international footballers
Association football midfielders
Sportspeople from Nassau, Bahamas
Southern Wesleyan University alumni
Southern Nazarene Crimson Storm men's soccer players
Bahamian expatriate sportspeople in the United States
Bahamian expatriate footballers
Expatriate soccer players in the United States
USL League Two players
United Premier Soccer League players